Radha Krishna Kumar (born 2 August 1984) is an Indian film director and screenwriter who works primarily in Telugu cinema.

Life

He made his directorial debut Jil produced by UV Creations. He worked as an assistant director under Chandra Sekhar Yeleti for the films Anukokunda Oka Roju (2005), Okkadunnadu (2007), Prayanam (2009) and Sahasam (2013). His recent film, with Prabhas titled as Radhe Shyam and produced by UV creations and T-Series, has released on March 11, 2022.

He wrote screenplays and dialogues for Prayanam and Sahasam, for which he worked as 1st assistant director as well. He debuted as a director with Jil (2014).

Filmography

All films are in Telugu, otherwise noted.

References

External links 
 

1984 births
Living people
Telugu film directors
21st-century Indian film directors
Telugu screenwriters
Indian screenwriters
Film directors from Andhra Pradesh
Screenwriters from Andhra Pradesh
People from Visakhapatnam